Izzatullah, also spelled Ezzatullah or Ezatullah, is a common masculine muslim given name, formed from the elements Izzat and Allah of originally Arabic origin and meaning 'majesty', 'honor' and 'might' of Allah.

The name is widespread among moslem Turkic peoples in the form of the first names Izzatulla, Izzatullo, Gizzatulla as well as adopted in Russian in the form of the turkic family names Izzatulloev, Izzatullaev, Gizzatullin (corrupted versions: Gizzatulin/Izzatulin, Gizatullin/Izatullin, Gizatulin/Izatulin). The native turkic forms of the family names are Izzatulla, Izzatullo, Gizzatulla.

List of people with the given name Izzatullah
Izzatullah Bengali, 18th-century Persian author
 Ezatullah (Nangarhar), Afghan militia leader who helped set up a provisional government after the Taliban retreated in November 2001 from Nangarhar Province
 Ezatullah Haqqani, Afghan member of the Taliban's Council
 Izzatullah Wasifi (born 1958), chief of Afghanistan's General Independent Administration of Anti Corruption, formerly governor of Herat Province
 Ezatullah Zawab, Afghan journalist who was kidnapped in retaliation for publishing an article critical of local clerics
 Mullah Ezat or Ezatullah, Afghan commander from Paghman district in Kabul Province and ally of Abdul Rasul Sayyaf who participated in the Afshar Operation
Hiztullah Yar Nasrat or Izatullah Nasrat Yar, Afghan held in Guantanamo
Izatullah Dawlatzai (born 1991), Afghan cricketer
Ezatullah, Afghan cricketer
Ezzatollah Pourghaz, Iranian Turkmen Football Player

Arabic masculine given names